Climate Action Network - International (CAN) is a global network of over 1,300 environmental non-governmental organisations in over 130 countries working to promote government and individual action to limit human-induced climate change to ecologically sustainable levels.

Activities 
It is most active at meetings of the United Nations Framework Convention on Climate Change. It published civil society's ECO newsletter presenting the views of civil society and communities around the world during the climate negotiations, and the satirical Fossil of the Day Awards to countries who are blocking the progress at the climate negotiations in implementing the Paris Agreement. It also supports and coordinates its members in its global network through capacity-building, campaigns, projects and mobilisations to urge governments and other stakeholders to act on the climate emergency.

CAN members work to achieve this goal through the coordination of information exchange and non-governmental organizational strategy on international, regional and national climate issues. CAN members place a high priority on both a healthy environment and development that "meets the needs of the present without compromising the ability of future generations to meet their own needs" (Brundtland Commission). Climate Action Network's vision is to protect the atmosphere while allowing for sustainable and equitable development worldwide. It was founded in 1989 by Michael Oppenheimer in Germany.

Regional and national networks 

CAN has formal regional and national networks called nodes which coordinate these efforts.

Regional Nodes 

 CAN-Arab World
 CAN-Eastern Africa
 CAN Eastern Europe, Caucasus and Central Asia (CAN-EECCA)
 CAN-Europe
 CAN Latin American (CANLA)
 Pacific Islands CAN (PICAN)
 CAN-South Asia (CANSA)
 Southern African Region CAN (SARCAN)
 CAN-South East Asia (CANSEA)
 CAN West and Central Africa (CANWA)

National Network Nodes

 CAN-Australia (CANA)
 CAN-Rac Canada
 CAN-China (informal)
 
 CAN-Japan
 New Zealand Climate Action Network
 CAN-South Africa (SACAN)
 CAN-Tanzania
 CAN-Uganda
US Climate Action Network (USCAN)

Climate Action Network Tanzania 
Climate Action Network Tanzania is an environmental non-governmental and non-profit organization founded in 2011, with its headquarters in Dar es Salaam, Tanzania. It operates under the umbrella organisation Climate Action Network International. Since its inception, it has established partnerships with more than 50 civil society organizations across the country, as well as a number of government ministries and agencies including environment, local government, agriculture, livestock and fisheries, energy (department of renewable energy and policy), natural resources and tourism, water, work and finance especially the Planning Commission. It also works with the parliamentary standing committees and research institutions, in furtherance of implementing a Low Carbon Growth and the adaption to current climate change impacts.

Objectives 
Together with its stakeholders, Climate Action Network Tanzania works towards climate sustainability and poverty reduction through enhanced community livelihood activities and a climate-resilient economy. Promoting renewable energy, reducing emissions from deforestation and forest degradation programmes and the sustainable use of water resources, it is fostering a low carbon development. Moreover, its goal is to develop a networking structure in order to inform and empower the Tanzanian community, providing a platform for public dialogues, with the purpose of giving Tanzania a national voice in the international climate change debate and raise awareness to enforce a climate-resilient behaviour. Climate Action Network Tanzania targets the implementation of effective national policies, strategies and actions concerning climate change impacts. Furthermore, their mission is bringing the international climate agenda into the local context of Tanzania to embrace Agenda 2030 and the Paris Agreement. In the interest of an accurate operation and socio-economic development Climate Action Network Tanzania undertakes scientific research on climate change and environment development in several areas throughout Tanzania.

Its areas of work are:

 Water resources 
 Renewable energy  
 Low carbon development 
 Climate finance 
 Poverty & livelihood 
 Capacity building  
 Agenda 2030 & Paris agreement  
 Adaption  
 Food and agriculture

Projects  
Climate Action Network Tanzania organises workshops and seminars among stakeholders from government institutions and ministries, private sector, development partners and civil society to discuss the current and future climate change and environmental related effects on community wellbeing and economic growth.  It also has several projects, including

 Aligning climate resilience, sustainable development and poverty reduction in Tanzania  
 Participatory and inclusive planning and implementation: A capacity enhancement approach for community resilience and sustainable development in western Kilimanjaro-Lake Natron ecosystem

Finance  
Climate Action Network Tanzania is a non-profit and non-governmental organisation. It finances itself through sponsoring, donations and financial backing from foundations. Its fundraising is based on their ethical fundraising strategy, which includes that they neither take money from foundations whose ethics do not align with theirs, nor accept money bound to conditions which would modify their work or representation.

Member organizations 

CAN has over 1,300 members is over 130 countries across various regions.

 USCAN (US Climate Action Network)

See also
 Individual and political action on climate change
 Chesapeake Climate Action Network

Notes and references

External links

 Climate Network official website
Climate Action Network Tanzania
 UNFCCC.int Non-State Actor Zone for Climate Action (NAZCA)

Environmental organisations based in Lebanon
International climate change organizations